United Nations Security Council Resolution 397, adopted on November 22, 1976, after examining the application of the People's Republic of Angola for membership in the United Nations, the Council recommended to the General Assembly that Angola (now the Republic of Angola) be admitted.

The resolution was adopted by 13 votes to none, while the United States abstained and China did not participate in the voting.

See also
 List of United Nations member states
 List of United Nations Security Council Resolutions 301 to 400 (1971–1976)

References
Text of the Resolution at undocs.org

External links
 

 0397
 0397
 0397
November 1976 events
1976 in Angola